The 1973 Pau Grand Prix was a Formula Two motor race held on 6 May 1973 at the Pau circuit, in Pau, Pyrénées-Atlantiques, France. The Grand Prix was won by François Cevert, driving the Alpine A367. Jean-Pierre Jarier finished second and Tim Schenken third.

Classification

Race

References

Pau Grand Prix
1973 in French motorsport